Lovisa Claesson (born 21 February 1995) is a Swedish rower. She competed in the women's single sculls event at the 2020 Summer Olympics.

Her father, Per-Olof, represented Sweden in rowing at the 1988 and 1992 Summer Olympics.

References

External links
 

1995 births
Living people
Swedish female rowers
Olympic rowers of Sweden
Rowers at the 2020 Summer Olympics
Place of birth missing (living people)
21st-century Swedish women